The Wooden Church is a church in Sighetu Silvaniei, Romania, built in 1632 in Sălăjeni, Sălaj.

Bibliography
 Cristache-Panait, Ioana (17 August 1978). „Biserica Sf. Arhangheli Mihail și Gavril din Sighetu Silvaniei”. Monumente istorice bisericești din Eparhia Ortodoxă Română a Oradei. Biserici de lemn: 391, Oradea.
 Studii regionale Cristache-Panait, Ioana (17 August 1971). „Bisericile de lemn din Sălaj”. Buletinul Monumentelor Istorice 1971 (1): 31–40.
 Ghergariu, Leontin (17 August 1973). „Meșterii construcțiilor monumentale de lemn din Sălaj”. AMET 1971-73: 255–273, Cluj.
 Godea, Ioan (17 August 1996). Biserici de lemn din România (nord-vestul Transilvaniei). București: Editura Meridiane.

References

External links
 Sighetu Silvaniei, Wooden church

Historic monuments in Sălaj County
Religious buildings and structures completed in 1632
Wooden churches in Sălaj County
1632 establishments in the Ottoman Empire